Alireza Salimi is an Iranian professional football player currently playing for Baadraan in the Azadegan League.

Career
Salimi played for Tarbiat Yazd before moving to Foolad in the summer of 2010. After Sosha Makani's move to Persepolis before the start of 2014–15 season, Salimi was made as the first-choice goalkeeper by club coach Dragan Skočić.

Club career statistics

Honours
Foolad
Iran Pro League (1): 2013–14

References

External links

1984 births
Living people
Iranian footballers
Persian Gulf Pro League players
Azadegan League players
Esteghlal F.C. players
Tarbiat Yazd players
Foolad FC players
People from Yazd
Association football goalkeepers
Sportspeople from Yazd